Givens Price (born October 3, 1994) is a former American football offensive tackle. He played college football at Nebraska. He was signed by the Arizona Cardinals as an undrafted free agent after the 2016 NFL Draft.

High school career
Price attended Alief Taylor High School where he was offensive guard. As a senior, in 2010, he helped the team average 39.6 points-per-game. He was a second-team Class 5A All-State selection. He was rated one of the top 70 offensive guards in the nation by both ESPN and Scout. He was recruited by Baylor, Rice, and UTEP.

College career
Price enrolled at the University of Nebraska to play for the Cornhuskers and majored in accounting and management. In 2011, as a freshman he redshirt the season. As a redshirt freshman in 2012, he appeared in three games as a back-up offensive lineman. In 2013 as a redshirt sophomore, he appeared in eight games as a back-up guard, late season injuries increased his role on the offense. As a redshirt junior in 2014, he appeared in 12 games, starting three games at right tackle. During his first career start, against Florida Atlantic, he helped the Nebraska offense set a Big Ten, modern era, single game record for total offense with 784 yards, including 498 rushing yards. In 2015, he converted to the defensive line to help provide depth. He appeared in two games that season.

Professional career

Arizona Cardinals
After going undrafted in the 2016 NFL Draft, Price signed with the Arizona Cardinals on May 2, 2016. He was released during final cuts on September 3, 2016 and was signed to the Cardinals' practice squad the next day. On December 14, 2016, he was promoted to the active roster. He made his professional debut during Week 17 against the Los Angeles Rams.

On September 2, 2017, Price was waived by the Cardinals. He re-signed to the practice squad on September 12. He was released two days later. He was re-signed to the practice squad on October 11, 2017. He was released on October 24, 2017.

Washington Redskins
On October 31, 2017, Price was signed to the Washington Redskins' practice squad. He was released on November 8, 2017.

Tampa Bay Buccaneers
On November 22, 2017, Price was signed to the Tampa Bay Buccaneers' practice squad. He signed a reserve/future contract with the Buccaneers on January 3, 2018.

On September 1, 2018, Price was waived by the Buccaneers.

References

External links
 Nebraska Cornhuskers bio
 Arizona Cardinals bio

1994 births
Living people
Players of American football from Houston
American football offensive linemen
American football defensive linemen
Nebraska Cornhuskers football players
Arizona Cardinals players
Washington Redskins players
Tampa Bay Buccaneers players